Mihály Fincicky (Čepeľ, since 1914 part of Velke Kapusany, 22 September 1842 – Ungvár 1916) was a Hungarian lawyer, translator, collector of folk songs and folk tales, lifelong mayor of Ungvár since 1891.

Biography 
He and his colleagues collected 339 folk-songs and 92 folk tales. The original version of this collection of Rusyn songs is unavailable. The collection has been published in Hungarian by Kisfaludy Társaság in 1870 as a part of the series Hazai, nem magyar ajkú népköltészet tára. After retiring, he translated 40 of the fairy tales collected by him. These were published in 1970.

Sources 
 Sztripszky Hiador: Ethnographia, 1916.
 Berze Nagy János: Magyar népmesetípusok (I–II., Pécs, 1957).
 
 

Hungarian ethnographers
1842 births
1916 deaths